Sara Brigitte Ulrik née Tscherning (9 July 1855 -22  May 1916) was a Danish flower painter.

Biography
Born in Ørholm north of Copenhagen, she was the daughter of the army officer and politician Anton Frederik Tscherning (1795–1874). Her sister, Anthonore Christensen, (1849–1926) was also a flower painter. She studied and painted wild flowers and weeds, together with other flowers she found, possibly inspired by her mother, Eleonore Christine Lützow (1817–1890), who was also a painter. She taught flower painting until ca. 1879. In 1879, she married the physician Axel Ulrik (1846–1930). After her marriage she continued to paint although she no longer exhibited. She died in Copenhagen.

References

1855 births
1916 deaths
19th-century Danish painters
Danish women painters
Artists from Copenhagen
19th-century Danish women artists